Stephen Blasius Melter  (January 2, 1886 - January 28, 1962) was an American pitcher in Major League Baseball who played for the St. Louis Cardinals in 1909.

Sources

Major League Baseball pitchers
St. Louis Cardinals players
Baseball players from Iowa
1886 births
1962 deaths
Sioux City Packers players
Omaha Rourkes players
Boise Irrigators players
Spokane Indians players
Denver Bears players
Butte Miners players
Grand Rapids Black Sox players
People from Cherokee, Iowa